9300 may refer to:
 The year 9300, in the 10th millennium.
 NVIDIA GeForce 9300, a computer graphics card series
 Nokia 9300, a smartphone